The 1966–67 season was Cardiff City F.C.'s 40th season in the Football League. They competed in the 22-team Division Two, then the second tier of English football, finishing twentieth.

Players

League standings

Results by round

Fixtures and results

Second Division

League Cup

FA Cup

Welsh Cup

See also

List of Cardiff City F.C. seasons

References

Welsh Football Data Archive

Cardiff City F.C. seasons
Cardiff City
Card